John Jacob Charles William Smith (born January 21, 1990) is an American actor. He began his career as a young child, making several guest appearances on popular TV shows before being cast as Owen Salinger on Party of Five, a role he held for two years. After the series' end, Smith went on to appear in Phantom of the Megaplex, a Disney Channel Original Movie, in 2000 and then in Cheaper by the Dozen and its sequel, Cheaper by the Dozen 2, in 2003 and 2005, respectively.

Life and career
Smith was born in Monrovia, California on January 21, 1990. He has two siblings, brother Nathan and sister Natasha.

Smith began acting at age six, appearing on several television series, including Walker, Texas Ranger, Party of Five, and Step by Step. During this period, he also starred in the made-for-television films Evolution's Child and the Disney Channel production Phantom of the Megaplex.

Smith was cast as Hansel, opposite Taylor Momsen's Gretel, in the 2002 film version of Hansel and Gretel, which received a limited theatrical release in October 2002. He was subsequently cast as one of twelve children in the family comedy Cheaper by the Dozen, which was released in December 2003 and became a box office success, gaining Smith renown with pre-teen audiences. In 2004, he had a minor role in the film Troy and appeared on the television series Without a Trace. He went on to reprise his role of Jake Baker in Cheaper by the Dozen 2, which was released in December 2005 and performed fairly well at the box office.

Filmography

References

External links

1990 births
20th-century American male actors
21st-century American male actors
Male actors from California
American male child actors
American male film actors
American skateboarders
American male television actors
Living people
People from Greater Los Angeles